Peel County is a historic county in the Canadian province of Ontario. Named for Sir Robert Peel, Prime Minister of the United Kingdom, the county was organized in 1851. Settlers, however, were in Toronto Township as early as 1807. The Credit River was reserved for the Mississaugas, however they sold their land and moved to the Bruce Peninsula.

Formation and history

The townships that would eventually constitute Peel were initially part of York County in the Home District, and were designated as the West Riding of York in 1845.

The following communities were organized:

The County was created in 1851, forming part of the United Counties of York, Ontario and Peel. It was given its own provisional county council in 1856, and was formally separated from York in 1860.

However, disputes as to whether the county seat should be Malton or Brampton prompted the provisional council to request that the separation be reversed, and an 1862 Act of the Parliament of the Province of Canada brought that into effect, reviving the United Counties of York and Peel. In 1866, the counties were re-separated.

In 1973, Peel County became the Regional Municipality of Peel, as a result of the Ontario provincial government's regionalization of the rapidly developing counties surrounding Toronto.

Further reading

See also
 List of Ontario census divisions
List of townships in Ontario

References

External links
 1951 map of Peel County

Former counties in Ontario
History of the Regional Municipality of Peel
Populated places disestablished in 1973